Ramanujan College is a constituent college of University of Delhi. It is named after the Indian mathematician Srinivasa Ramanujan. It is located in Kalkaji, near Nehru Place in South Delhi. The college runs fifteen courses in the disciplines of Humanities, Commerce, Management, Mathematical Sciences, Computer Science and Vocational Studies. It is also the study center for the students of the Non- Collegiate Women's Education Board, University of Delhi and the Indira Gandhi National Open University. Ramanujan College has been accredited grade "A++" by the National Assessment and Accreditation Council (NAAC). Ramanujan College has also been selected by the MHRD as a Teaching Learning Center and National Resource Center.

History 
The Ramanujan College, formerly known as Deshbandhu College (Evening) was established in 1958 by the Ministry of Rehabilitation, Government of India, in the memory of Late Deshbandhu Gupta, a patriot who had dedicated his life to the national freedom struggle. The Deshbandhu College (Evening) operated from the premises of the Deshbandhu College that functioned in the morning hours. Originally run by the Ministry of Rehabilitation and Education as a men's College, Deshbandhu College (Evening) became a co-educational institution in 1994. This college, which is 100% funded by the University Grants Commission has been maintained by the University of Delhi since 1972.

Until the early 90's the College catered to a large number of students who were gainfully employed in the daytime and pursued their studies in the convenience provided by an evening College. During its initial years the College used to function in the late evening hours and developed as a reputed College especially in the field of Commerce studies. Other than B. Com (Honours) and B.Com., the College offered B.A. Programme and Honours courses in English, Hindi and Political Science to its students. The college was also unique because it offered the study of regional languages: Bengali, Punjabi,  Sindhi. Late Dr. M. L. Jotwani, an eminent scholar of Sindhi literature and language was a member of the college teaching faculty and did the college proud when he received the Padma Shri in 2003.

In the year 2010, Deshbandhu College (Evening) was renamed as Ramanujan College, and allocated separate space of seven acres of land within the existing College campus in Kalkaji, New Delhi. From an evening College it became a full-fledged morning college in 2012.

Academics

Undergraduate Courses 

 B.Com. (H)
 B.Com. 
 Bachelor of Management Studies (B.M.S.)
 B. A. (H) Economics
 B. A. (H)  English
 B.A. (H) Hindi
 B. A. (H) Philosophy
 B. A. (H) Political Science
 B. A. (H) Applied Psychology
 B. A. Program
 B. Sc. (H) Computer Science
 B. Sc. (H) Mathematics
 B.Sc. (H) Environmental Science
 B. Sc. (H) Statistics
 B. Voc.  Banking Operations
 B.Voc. Software Development

Certificate and Diploma Courses 

 International Financial Reporting Standards (IFRS)
 Tally
 Human Rights
 Mass Media
 Radio Jockey and Broadcasting
 Business Analytics
 Research and Data Analysis
 Happiness by The School of Happiness

Departments and Faculty 
The college has highly qualified, committed and talented teaching faculty members who facilitate the students to keep abreast with academic challenges and developments. Their teaching-learning methods encourage inter-disciplinary approaches through innovation projects, conferences, seminars, talks and workshops. Experiential learning techniques are used for an effective implementation of the curriculum.  A large number of the teachers have original published academic and creative works in reputed national and international journals. There are 16 Departments in the college: Applied Psychology, Commerce, Computer Science, Economics, English, Environmental Studies, Hindi, History, Management Studies, Mathematics, Philosophy, Physical Education, Political Science, Punjabi, Statistics and Vocation. These departments regularly organise National and International Conferences/ Workshops/ Seminars/ Guest Lectures on regular basis to augment the knowledge base of students and faculty members.

Publications 
Ramanujan College publishes two journals annually:

 Ramanujan International Journal of Business and Research (ISSN: 2455-5959) (UGC Listed) 
 International Journal of Applied Ethics (ISSN: 2321-2497).

College Campus 
In 2017, a new independent environment-friendly building of the college has been constructed with state of art class-rooms, laboratories, staff rooms and an auditorium. The new building is supported by a gigantic service centre with provision of a sewage treatment plant, solar panels, water harvesting plant, electric sub-station and power generators. Some key features of the college campus are:

 Clean & Green Campus with uninterrupted Electricity & Water Supply
 ICT enabled Smart Classrooms with Projectors
 Multiple Computer Labs with latest Hardware & Software with 1500 Desktops and Laptops
 Language & Media Lab with latest Audio - Visual Equipment
 Psychology and Accounting & Finance Lab
 Wi-Fi Connectivity
 Indoor and Outdoor Gymnasium
 Fully Equipped Medical Room

Library 
The college has a fully computerized library, which works on Online Public Access Catalogue (OPAC) system that helps to locate all the reading material available on the computer. The library is spacious and has been divided into various sections— reference, textbook and newspapers & magazines. Fully Air-Conditioned separate reading rooms for the students and teachers make it more user-friendly. The library is well stocked with more than 45,000 books and subscribes to various e-journals. It also provides access to in-house/remote access to e-publications and other subscribed resources of the University of Delhi.

Academic Catalysts: Centers & Cells

Antha Prerna Cell 
The Antha Prerna Cell-Engineering Ideas to Reality, was inaugurated on 18 January 2019, under the aegis of the Department of Computer Science, Ramanujan College. The Cell aims to provide a platform for the students to give life to their innovative ideas by implementing them on industrial projects and nurture them as future corporate professionals. This will bridge the gap between industry and academics and make the students industry-ready. The Cell will benefit not only students from all the disciplines by involving them in various aspects of the live projects.

Centre for Robotics and Artificial Intelligence 
The Centre for Robotics and Artificial Intelligence was established in November 2013. Centre for Robotics and Artificial Intelligence is working on emerging areas in the field of robotics, embedded systems and machine intelligence. The students under the centre are currently working on the star innovation project “Robotics in healthcare” in which they are trying to reduce the costs of existing machines and increasing their efficiency.

Centre for Ethics and Values 
Centre for Ethics and Values (CEV) at Ramanujan College was established in 2010. CEV was created with an objective of functioning as a Resource Centre for imparting values-based education to students and professionals. The role of CEV was envisaged as creation of awareness in the learners’ community that skills and ethical values are essentially complementary. CEV is engaged with rigorous investigation of ethical issues, enlightened dialogue and the dissemination of knowledge that will lead to informed moral choice.

Centre for Human Rights Studies 
The Centre for Human Rights Studies was established in February 2015, under of aegis of the Department of Political Science. The Centre coordinates a three-month UGC-Sponsored Certificate Course on Human Rights. Eminent resource persons are invited to deliver lectures on the prescribed syllabus. Students are required to submit a project report along with a Power-Point presentation at the end of the course.

Centre for Social Innovation 
The Centre for Social Innovation was established in January 2016 with a vision to enact greater social links and creating new societal development and further to seek inspiration from the ventures so that others can take a step forward. The centre was set up as part of the star innovation project entitled “Sociovation,” sanctioned by University of Delhi, aimed to create a common platform to provide unison of all socio-innovators, students and the needy to be able to make a huge difference in bringing a radical change in the society.  It has identified the four core issues as its thrust areas: Women Empowerment, Water Conservation, Illiteracy, Cleanliness and Sanitation.

Research Development and Services Cell 
The Cell was formed in 2017 to promote research and development activities in the college. The cell successfully completed several academic and consultancy projects. To promote research amongst students, cell also provides incentives to them.

Thrust: Entrepreneurship Cell 
It was formed in October 2015 to harness the creative and skillful qualities of the students and create successful business ventures run by the students.

Ramanujan College also has 15 students societies engaged in dancing, music, social entrepreneurship, commerce, fashion, and more.

Appreciable Highlights

DDU Kaushal Kendra 
Ramanujan College has been sanctioned Deen Dayal Upadhyay Centre for Knowledge Acquisition and Up-gradation of Skilled Human Abilities and Livelihood (KAUSHAL) by University Grants Commission in 2016. Ramanujan College is the only institution in the University of Delhi which has been sanctioned this scheme under which the college is offering B. Vocational Courses in Banking Operations and Software Development;

Teaching Learning Centre 
Ramanujan College was awarded Teaching Learning Centre (TLC) under the Pandit Madan Mohan Malaviya National Mission on Teachers and Teaching (PMMMNMTT), sponsored by the Ministry of Human Resource Development in 2017. The Centre runs along the mission, objectives and the guidelines set up by the MHRD and has at its core the idea of facilitating teaching leaning process to the teachers across the country, especially those located in the remote areas of the country. Ramanujan College is the second college of the University of Delhi to be awarded the Teaching Learning Centre (TLC), the most sought-after scheme of the MHRD. Under this scheme, the centre has successfully trained more than 3500 teachers till March 2020. To continue the teaching-learning process in COVID-19 pandemic with the same pace, the centre has organized FDP/FIP/Workshop online having virtual engagement with all participants/learners. This initiative of the centre has received an overwhelming response from all over the country and more than 22000 teachers have been trained since April 2020 and several programmes are still ongoing.

National Resource Centre 
The Ministry of HRD notified Ramanujan College as the National Resource Centre (NRC) in 2019 for three extremely pertinent and interrelated disciplines, namely, Human Rights, Environment and Ethics. The NRC's role is to conceptualise, create and disseminate contemporary knowledge in the field of study. This initiative is undertaken by the MHRD under the ambit of the Annual Refresher Programme in Teaching (ARPIT).

International Collaborations 
The Ramanujan College has signed an Agreement of Academic Cooperation with MCI Management Center Innsbruck, Austria for a period of five years recognizing the benefits to be gained by both institutions through a cooperation in teaching, academic research and operations, promote exchange of students, staff and knowledge within the interests and abilities of each institution. Exchange of students and academic staff along with joint development and organization of academic programs, courses or seminars and research will be the focus of this collaborative effort.

Rankings 
It is ranked 53rd across India by National Institutional Ranking Framework in 2021.

References

External links
 Official website of Ramanujan College
Delhi University website profile of Ramanujan College

Universities and colleges in Delhi
South Delhi district
Educational institutions established in 2010
Delhi University
2010 establishments in Delhi